{{DISPLAYTITLE:C8H18O}}
The molecular formula C8H18O may refer to:

 Di-tert-butyl ether
 Dibutyl ether
 2-Ethylhexanol
 Octanols
 1-Octanol
 2-Octanol
 3-Octanol
 4-Octanol
 3,5-dimethylhexan-3-ol
 2,3,4-trimetilpentan-2-ol